February 25 - Eastern Orthodox liturgical calendar - February 27

All fixed commemorations below are observed on March 11 (March 10 on leap years) by Eastern Orthodox Churches on the Old Calendar.

For February 26th, Orthodox Churches on the Old Calendar commemorate the Saints listed on February 13.

Saints

 Martyr Photine (Photina), the Samaritan woman in the Gospel, and those with her, all martyred under Nero (66):  (see also: March 20)
 her sisters: Phota, Photis, Parasceva, and Cyriaca (Kyriake);
 her sons: Victor Stratelates (or Photinus) and Joses (Joseph); 
 Christodoulos;
 Sebastian the Duke,
 the officer Anatolius; and 
 Theoclitus, the former sorcerer. 
 Saint Porphyrius of Gaza, Bishop of Gaza (420)
 Saint Nicholas of "Katopinos".

Pre-Schism Western saints

 Saint Dionysius of Augsburg, venerated as the first Bishop of Augsburg in Germany (c. 303)
 Saint Faustinian, second Bishop of Bologna in Italy (4th century)
 Saint Andrew of Florence, Bishop of Florence and Confessor (c. 407)
 Saint Agricola, Bishop of Nevers in France (c. 594)
 Saint Victor, a hermit in Arcis-sur-Aube in Champagne in France (7th century)

Post-Schism Orthodox saints

 Venerable Sebastian of Poshekhonye, founder of Sokhotsk Monastery, Yaroslavl (1500)  (see also: December 18)
 New Martyr John the Cabinetmaker (John Calphas, "the Apprentice"), by beheading, at Constantinople (1575)

New martyrs and confessors

 New Hieromartyr Peter Varlamov, Priest of Ufim (1930)
 New Hieromartyr Sergius Voskresensky, Priest (1933)
 Virgin-martyr Anna Blagoveshchensky (1937)
 New Hieromartyr John (Pashin), Bishop of Rylsk (Rila) (1938)
 New Hieromartyr John Dunaev, Priest (1938)

Other commemorations

 Synaxis of the Mezhetsk Icon of the Most Holy Theotokos at Kiev (1492)

Icon gallery

Notes

References

Sources
 February 26 / March 11. Orthodox Calendar (Pravoslavie.ru).
 March 11 / February 26. Holy Trinity Russian Orthodox Church (A parish of the Patriarchate of Moscow).
 February 26. OCA - The Lives of the Saints.
 The Autonomous Orthodox Metropolia of Western Europe and the Americas. St. Hilarion Calendar of Saints for the year of our Lord 2004. St. Hilarion Press (Austin, TX). pp. 17-18.
 The Twenty-Sixth Day of the Month of February. Orthodoxy in China.
 February 26. Latin Saints of the Orthodox Patriarchate of Rome.
 The Roman Martyrology. Transl. by the Archbishop of Baltimore. Last Edition, According to the Copy Printed at Rome in 1914. Revised Edition, with the Imprimatur of His Eminence Cardinal Gibbons. Baltimore: John Murphy Company, 1916. pp. 17-18.
 Rev. Richard Stanton. A Menology of England and Wales, or, Brief Memorials of the Ancient British and English Saints Arranged According to the Calendar, Together with the Martyrs of the 16th and 17th Centuries. London: Burns & Oates, 1892. p. 86.
Greek Sources
 Great Synaxaristes:  26 Φεβρουαρίου. Μεγασ Συναξαριστησ.
  Συναξαριστής. 26 Φεβρουαρίου. Ecclesia.gr. (H Εκκλησια τησ Ελλαδοσ). 
Russian Sources
  11 марта (26 февраля). Православная Энциклопедия под редакцией Патриарха Московского и всея Руси Кирилла (электронная версия). (Orthodox Encyclopedia - Pravenc.ru).
  26 февраля (ст.ст.) 11 марта 2014 (нов. ст.). Русская Православная Церковь Отдел внешних церковных связей.

February in the Eastern Orthodox calendar